Erkko Kivikoski (2 July 1936 – 11 August 2005) was a Finnish film director and screenwriter. He directed nine films between 1962 and 1981. His 1963 film Kesällä kello 5 was entered into the 14th Berlin International Film Festival. His 1981 film Night by the Seashore was entered into the 12th Moscow International Film Festival where it won a Special Diploma.

Filmography
 Kaasua, komisario Palmu! (Cinematographer)
 EP-X-503 (1962)
 Tori (1963)
 Kesällä kello 5 (1963)
 Käyntikorttini... (1964)
 Ovi (1966)
 Kuuma kissa? (1968)
 Kesyttömät veljekset (1969)
 Laukaus tehtaalla (1973)
 Yö meren rannalla (1981)

References

External links

1936 births
2005 deaths
People from Iisalmi
Finnish film directors
Finnish screenwriters
Finnish cinematographers
20th-century Finnish people
20th-century screenwriters